The Dellville Covered Bridge is a wooden covered bridge located in Dellville Pennsylvania.

The original bridge was listed on the National Register of Historic Places in 1980.

On November 3, 2014, it was significantly damaged in a fire that police later ruled was arson. In 2017, work removing the burned and charred remains of the old Dellville Covered Bridge began, and in 2018, the work rebuilding the bridge began in earnest. By July 2019, the new replica bridge was completed at a cost of $966,000. In November 2019, two men were charged as juveniles for the arson.

References 

Covered bridges on the National Register of Historic Places in Pennsylvania
Covered bridges in Perry County, Pennsylvania
Bridges completed in 1889
Wooden bridges in Pennsylvania
Bridges in Perry County, Pennsylvania
Tourist attractions in Perry County, Pennsylvania
National Register of Historic Places in Perry County, Pennsylvania
Road bridges on the National Register of Historic Places in Pennsylvania
Burr Truss bridges in the United States
Covered bridges in the United States destroyed by arson